The urban unit of Grenoble is a French urban unit centred on the city of Grenoble. An urban unit is a contiguously built-up area with at least 2,000 inhabitants, according to the definition by the French statistics institute INSEE. In the current zoning, revised in 2020, it consists of 38 communes. It covers 358.1 km2 and has 451,096 inhabitants (2018), population density 1260 /km2. The urban unit largely overlaps with, but should not be confused with, the administrative entity Grenoble-Alpes Métropole.

See also
Grenoble metropolitan area

References

Grenoble